Robert Warden Lee (14 December 18686 January 1958) was a British lawyer, Rhodes Professor of Roman-Dutch law, and Fellow of All Souls College, Oxford.

Life and career 
Robert Warden Lee was born in Hanmer, Flintshire, the son of a vicar, the Revd Matthew Henry Lee. He was educated at Rossall School, followed by Balliol College, Oxford, where he was awarded a double first in classics. Following his graduation in 1891, he worked in the Ceylon Civil Service, during which time he developed an interest in Roman-Dutch law, the legal system of British Ceylon.

Lee was called to the bar by Gray's Inn in 1896. He practiced before the Privy Council, mainly in appeals from Ceylon. He also taught law at Worcester College, Oxford, where he was made fellow in 1903. He became the chair of Roman-Dutch law at London University in 1906. In 1914, he became dean of the Law Faculty of McGill University in Montreal. In 1921, Lee returned to the University of Oxford as its first professor of Roman-Dutch law, and as a Fellow of All Souls. He published multiple books on Roman-Dutch law throughout his career.

Lee married Amice Anna Botham in 1914, with whom he had one daughter, Amice Macdonell, a children's writer. Lee retired from his professorship at Oxford in 1956, at the age of eighty-seven, and died in 1958.

Collection 
Lee amassed a collection of rare books, ranging from the 17th to 20th centuries, the majority of which relate to Roman-Dutch law. Some of Lee's collection was bequeathed to the library of Gray's Inn, now designated the Lee Collection. Lee also donated 160 items to the Bodleian Libraries, Oxford.

References

External links 
 
 

1868 births
1958 deaths
Fellows of All Souls College, Oxford
People from Wrexham County Borough
People educated at Rossall School
Alumni of Balliol College, Oxford
Fellows of Worcester College, Oxford
Academics of the University of London
Academic staff of McGill University